UTAS is the acronym of the University of Tasmania.

UTAS may also refer to:
 UTAS or UTC Aerospace Systems, a former supplier of aerospace and defense products
 UTAS UTS-15, a shotgun
 UTAS XTR-12, a semi-automatic shotgun, manufactured by UTAS Defence of Turkey
 UTAS College of Arts & Law, a new (founded in 2017) college of the University of Tasmania
 Utas és holdvilág, the Hungarian for the novel Journey by Moonlight